Bridge Across Time, also known as Terror at London Bridge, is a 1985 American made-for-television drama film.  It was an NBC movie of the week, written by William F. Nolan, directed by E.W. Swackhamer and starred David Hasselhoff, Stepfanie Kramer, and Randolph Mantooth. The relocation of London Bridge to Lake Havasu City, Arizona is the basis of this film, and a series of murders is attributed to the spirit of Jack the Ripper, whose soul is transported to the United States in one of the stones of the bridge.

The film is also known as Arizona Ripper.

Synopsis
London Bridge, London, England, 1888. Jack the Ripper dies in the River Thames.

London Bridge, Lake Havasu City, Arizona, 1985. The last original stone used to rebuild London Bridge is laid, and all the city is happy. But from that moment on, some strange murders happen. The policeman, Don Gregory (David Hassellhoff) has some suspects, but his ideas are quite strange. He considers a revived Jack the Ripper, but nobody believes him.

Starring
 David Hasselhoff as Don Gregory
 Stepfanie Kramer as Angie
 Randolph Mantooth as Joe Nez
 Adrienne Barbeau as Lynn Chandler
 Clu Gulager as Chief Peter 'Pete' Dawson
 Lindsay Bloom as Elaine Gardner
 Ken Swofford as Ed Nebel
 Rose Marie as Alma Bellock
 Lane Smith as Anson Whitfield
 Paul Rossilli as Jack the Ripper

References

External links

1985 television films
1985 drama films
1985 horror films
NBC network original films
1985 films
Films scored by Lalo Schifrin
Films set in 1888
Films set in 1985
Films directed by E. W. Swackhamer